Minuscule 620 (in the Gregory-Aland numbering), α 207 (von Soden), is a Greek–Latin diglot minuscule manuscript of the New Testament, on parchment. Palaeographically it has been assigned to the 12th century. The manuscript is lacunose. Tischendorf labeled it by 149a, 349p, and 180r.

Description 

The codex contains the text of the Catholic epistles, Pauline epistles, and Book of Revelation on 150 parchment leaves (size ) with some lacunae. Written in two columns per page, 32 lines per page. Everything is written in abbreviations.

The order of books: Catholic epistles, Book of Revelation, and Pauline epistles. Hebrews is placed after Epistle to Philemon.

Text 

The Greek text of the codex is a representative of the Byzantine text-type. Aland placed it in Category V.

History 

The manuscript was added to the list of New Testament manuscripts by Johann Martin Augustin Scholz, who slightly examined its text in Book of Acts. Gregory saw the manuscript in 1886. The Greek text of Apocalypse was examined by Herman C. Hoskier.

Formerly it was labeled by 149a, 349p, and 180r. In 1908 Gregory gave the number 620 to it.

The manuscript currently is housed at the Laurentian Library (Conv. Soppr. 150), at Florence.

See also 

 List of New Testament minuscules
 Biblical manuscript
 Textual criticism
 Minuscule 619

References

Further reading 
 Herman C. Hoskier, Concerning the Text of the Apocalypse: Collation of All Existing Available Greek Documents with the Standard Text of Stephen’s Third Edition Together with the Testimony of Versions, Commentaries and Fathers. vol. 1 (London: Bernard Quaritch, Ltd., 1929), pp. 595 f.

Greek New Testament minuscules
12th-century biblical manuscripts